Glenn Earl Dodd (November 1, 1924 – October 30, 2004) was an American professional basketball player. Dodd was selected in the fifth round of the 1949 BAA Draft by the St. Louis Bombers after a collegiate career at Northeast Missouri. He played for the Denver Nuggets for nine total games in 1949.

References

1924 births
2004 deaths
American men's basketball players
Basketball players from Illinois
Denver Nuggets (1948–1950) players
Forwards (basketball)
People from Wood River, Illinois
St. Louis Bombers (NBA) draft picks
Truman Bulldogs men's basketball players